The Argentina men's national basketball team (Spanish: Selección de baloncesto de Argentina) represents Argentina in men's international basketball officially nicknamed The Argentine Soul (Spanish: El Alma Argentina),   and it is controlled by the Argentine Basketball Federation.

Argentina's national basketball team remains among the most successful in the Americas and one of the most successful in the world. It is the only national team in the FIBA Americas zone that has won the quintuplet crown: FIBA World Cup (they won the first edition, in 1950), Olympic Gold Medal (2004) (the highest honor and most important title of Argentina in the history of Argentina Basketball Men's Senior National Team), FIBA Diamond Ball (2008), FIBA AmeriCup (2001, 2011 and 2022) and Pan American Gold Medal (1995 and 2019). They are also one of only four countries to have won the Olympic gold medal and FIBA World Cup joining the Soviet Union, the United States of America, and Yugoslavia. They have also won 13 South American Basketball Championships, as well as many youth championships.

The Argentine representative were also the first country to defeat a United States national team with a full squad of NBA players. They did so by 87–80 in the 2002 FIBA World Championship held in Indianapolis. In that tournament, Argentina came second behind FR Yugoslavia, losing the final in overtime.

Due to the series of good results since the beginning of the 2000s (decade), Argentina reached the first position in the FIBA Men's Ranking at the end of the 2008 Olympic Games. Argentina is a founding member of the International Federation of Basketball (FIBA) and has South America's longest basketball tradition.

History

The practice of basketball in Argentina was started by Asociación Cristiana de Jóvenes (Young Men's Christians Association – YMCA) in 1912., with the first Federation ("Federación Argentina") established to organise competitions not only in Buenos Aires but in several cities around Argentina. 

Argentina played its first international game against Uruguay in 1921.

In 1950 Argentina won its first and only World Championship to date, with a squad formed entirely by amateur players, after defeating France (twice), Brazil, Chile, Egypt and the United States in the decisive match.

With the creation of the Liga Nacional de Básquet in the mid-1980s, a new generation of players led Argentina to a moderate success in the 1986 World Championship where the squad defeated United States for the first time in their history. Nevertheless, the progress of Argentine basketball would be shown in 2002 FIBA World Championship being the first team to defeat a United States roster composed entirely of NBA players and also reaching the final, finally losing to Yugoslavia.

2001 was the year when the Golden Generation raised, winning the first Argentina's FIBA Americas Championship -held in Neuquen-, where they defeated all of its rivals in the competition. In 2002 the team made history by being the first team to defeat a United States roster composed entirely of NBA players during the 2002 FIBA World Championship. Argentina would reach the finals for the first time since the first World Championship in 1950, But the most important achievement for the squad came in the 2004 Olympic Games in Athens when Argentina won their first gold medal (including another victory over the United States at the semi-finals). The Olympics title in 2004 is the higher honor and important title of Argentina in the history of the sport in the country.

Uniforms and suppliers

Since its establishment, the Argentina national team had worn white kits. The team had a long tenure wearing Topper, which was the official supplier since the 1970s to 2007. In 2002, two light blue horizontal stripes (similar to the National flag) were added to the jerseys. When the contract with Topper expired in 2007, the CABB signed an agreement with Chinese firm Li-Ning, which kept the design established by Topper.

Italian company Kappa was the uniforms supplier since 2013.
In 2014 the company designed a vertical striped model in the style of football and field hockey representatives. The jersey debuted in the 2014 FIBA Basketball World Cup. When Nike became official sponsor through its brand Air Jordan, the Argentina jersey returned to a simple white color scheme. The deal extended to 2020, when the American company ceased operations in Argentina.

Starting in 2022, Spanish Kelme is the current kit provider for all the Argentina basketball teams.

Honours
 Olympic Games
  Gold (1): 2004 
  Bronze (1): 2008
 FIBA World Cup
  Gold (1): 1950
  Silver (2): 2002, 2019
 FIBA Diamond Ball
  Gold (1): 2008
  Bronze (1): 2004
 FIBA Stanković Continental Champions' Cup
  Gold (1): 2013 (2)
  Silver (3): 2005, 2013 (1), 2016
 FIBA AmeriCup 
  Gold (3): 2001, 2011, 2022
  Silver (6): 1995, 2003, 2005, 2007, 2015, 2017
  Bronze (5): 1980, 1993, 1999, 2009, 2013
 Pan American Games
  Gold (2): 1995, 2019
  Silver (2): 1951, 1955
 South American Championship
  Gold (13): 1934, 1935, 1941, 1942, 1943, 1966, 1976, 1979, 1987, 2001, 2004, 2008, 2012
  Silver (12): 1930, 1938, 1940, 1973, 1983, 1989, 1993, 1995, 1999, 2003, 2010, 2014
  Bronze (13): 1932, 1939, 1945, 1960, 1961, 1969, 1971, 1977, 1981, 1985, 1991, 1997, 2006

Competition results

Olympic Games

FIBA World Cup

FIBA Diamond Ball

FIBA AmeriCup

South American Championship

Pan American Games

Players

Current roster
Roster for the 2022 FIBA AmeriCup.

Depth chart

Past roster
Roster for the men's basketball tournament at the 2020 Summer Olympics in Tokyo.

Retired numbers
In July 2017, the Argentine Basketball Confederation announced that numbers 5 and 13 would be retired since the 2017 edition of FIBA AmeriCup and for the rest of championships played by the senior team from then on.

Head coaches

 León Najnudel: (1985)
 Flor Meléndez: (1986-1987)
 Alberto Finger: (1987-1989)
 Carlos Boismené: (1989-1992)
 Walter Garrone: (1992)
 Guillermo Vecchio: (1993–1996)
 Julio Lamas: (1997–1999)
 Rubén Magnano: (2000–2004)
 Sergio Hernández: (2005–2010)
 Julio Lamas: (2011–2014)
 Sergio Hernández: (2015–2020)
 Gabriel Picatto: (2020-2021)
 Sergio Hernández: (2021)
 Néstor García: (2021-2022)
 Pablo Prigioni: (2022-Present)

References

External links

 
 FIBA profile
 Latinbasket – Argentina Men National Team
 Argentina Basketball Records at FIBA Archive
 Argentina – Tournament Highlights – 2014 FIBA Basketball World Cup on YouTube

 
 
Men's national basketball teams
1921 establishments in Argentina